Tren Hospital ALMA is a mobile children's hospital in Argentina. It treats the needy in locations in the Northwest region of the country (Santiago del Estero Province, Catamarca Province, Salta Province, Jujuy Province, Chaco Province, and Tucumán Province). This hospital provides medical and dental care, and health education at no cost to volunteers.  The hospital also contributes to the local teacher training on health issues.

History
The Alma Hospital has treated over 75,000 children and sometimes adults, but most severe cases are left to local hospitals and some to the city of Buenos Aires.  Cases of tuberculosis, Chagas disease and parasites are treated repeatedly in the Tren ALMA.

References

Children's hospitals in Argentina